Jérémy Chardy and Fabrice Martin were the defending champions, but Chardy chose not to participate this year and Martin chose to compete in Brisbane instead.

Oliver Marach and Mate Pavić won the title, defeating Jamie Murray and Bruno Soares in the final, 6–2, 7–6(8–6).

Seeds

Draw

Draw

References
 Main Draw

Doubles